James Thomas Leach (1805 – March 28, 1883) was a Confederate politician who served in the Confederate States Congress during the American Civil War.

Leach was born in Johnston County, North Carolina, and was a first cousin of James Madison Leach. He served in the North Carolina state legislature in 1858 and represented the state in the Second Confederate Congress from 1864 to 1865.

References
 Political Graveyard

Members of the Confederate House of Representatives from North Carolina
19th-century American politicians
People from Johnston County, North Carolina
North Carolina lawyers
Members of the North Carolina House of Representatives
1805 births
1883 deaths
19th-century American lawyers